Juniperus standleyi is a species of juniper native to Guatemala and the adjacent extreme southeast of Mexico (Volcán Tacaná in Chiapas), where it occurs at elevations of . Its local common names include huitó, cipres, and huitum.

Description
The leaves are of two forms, juvenile needle-like leaves 5–7 millimetres long on seedlings and occasionally (as regrowth after browsing damage) on adult plants, and adult scale-leaves 1–1.5 mm long on older plants; they are arranged in decussate opposite pairs or whorls of three.

The cones are globose, berry-like, 6–9 mm in diameter, blue-black with a thin pale waxy coating, and contain three to six seeds; they are mature in about 18 months. The male cones are 1.5–2 mm long, and shed their pollen in spring. It is dioecious with male and female cones on separate plants.

Conservation
Juniperus standleyi is threatened by habitat loss and illegal cutting for fuelwood.

References

standleyi
Trees of Chiapas
Trees of Guatemala
Endangered plants
Endangered biota of Mexico
Taxonomy articles created by Polbot
Dioecious plants
Flora of the Central American montane forests